Area A was one of the eight district electoral areas (DEA) which existed in Belfast, Northern Ireland from 1973 to 1985. Located in the south-east of the city, the district elected seven members to Belfast City Council and contained the wards of Ballymacarrett; Ballynafeigh; Orangefield; Ormeau; Rosetta; The Mount and Willowfield. The DEA formed part of the Belfast South and Belfast East constituencies.

History
The area was created for the 1973 local government elections, combining the whole of the former Ormeau ward with most of the former Pottinger ward. It was abolished for the 1985 local government elections. The Rosetta and Ballynafeigh wards became part of a new Laganbank DEA, while the remaining five wards joined the Bloomfield ward, formerly part of Area B, in the new Pottinger DEA.

Results

1973

1977

1981

References

Former District Electoral Areas of Belfast
1973 establishments in Northern Ireland
1985 disestablishments in Northern Ireland